Iran is subdivided into thirty-one provinces ( ostân), each governed from a local centre, usually the largest local city, which is called the capital (Persian: , markaz) of that province. The provincial authority is headed by a governor-general (Persian:  ostândâr), who is appointed by the Minister of the Interior subject to approval of the cabinet.

Modern history 

Iran has held its modern territory since the Treaty of Paris in 1857. Prior to 1937, Iran had maintained its feudal administrative divisional structure, dating back to the time the modern state was centralized by the Safavid dynasty in the 16th century. Although the boundaries, roles, and rulers changed often. On the eve of Persian Constitutional Revolution in 1905, Iran was composed of Tehran, being directly ruled by the Monarch, 4 "Eyalats", ruled by Qajar princes, and various "Velayats". Nomadic tribal confederations, such as Bakhtiari people and Qashqai people were largely independent of the domestic administrative divisions and were autonomous.

With the Constitutional revolution, and the formation of the first National Consultative Assembly, Iran's administrative subdivisions were legally defined in 1907. Any change in the boundaries of Eyalats, Velayats, or their respective sub-districts was banned as per the Iranian constitution, except with the passage of a new law by the assembly. As per the 1907 law, the following were defined:

On October 22, 1911, Iranian National Consultative Assembly passed another law, titled "The law of Election of National Consultative Assembly". This law presented a complete list of all Eyalats and Velayats of the country, as well as their constituent districts and cities. This list presented the grouping of various towns and districts into Electoral districts for the purpose of the election. According to this law, in 1911, Iran was made up of 27 administrative subdivisions, the region of Tehran, 4 Eyalats, and 22 Velayats. Below is a list: 

Capital City
Tehran
Eyalats
Azerbaijan
Fars
Kerman and Baluchistan
Khorasan and Sistan

Velayats
Arabistan
Astarabad (Gorgan)
Damavand
Gerrus (Bijar)
Gilan (Rasht)
Golpayegan, Kamareh, and Khansar
Hamadan
Iraq (Arak)
Isfahan
Kashan
Khamseh (Zanjan)
Kermanshahan
Kurdistan (Sanandaj)
Luristan (Borujerd)
Malayer
Mazandaran (Sari)
Qazvin
Qom
Saveh
Semnan and Damghan
Shahrud and Bastam
Yazd

In 1937, Iran was reorganized to form ten numbered provinces with subordinate governorates: Gilan; Mazandaran; East Azerbaijan; West Azerbaijan; Kermanshah; Khuzestan; Fars; Kerman; Khorasan; Isfahan. 

Iran has had a historical claim to Bahrain as its 14th province: Bahrain Province, until 1971 under British colonial occupation. Prior to 1957, Bahrain was placed under Fars Province. During Safavid Iran, Bahrain was subordinate to Bushehr governorship and Zubarah (located in modern-day country of Qatar) was its capital city. In 1737, under Afsharid dynasty Bahrain was made subject to Fars governorship. This claim was reasserted by the new theocratic Iranian leadership after 1979 with the famous 1981 coup attempt that occurred.

From 1960 to 1981, the governorates were raised to provincial status one by one. Since then several new provinces have been created, most recently in 2010 when the new Alborz Province was split from Tehran Province, and before that in 2004 when the province of Khorasan was divided into three provinces.

Information

Current provinces

According to Donya-e-Eqtesad, between 2017 and 2019, some 11 of the 20 poorest Iranian cities were in the province of Sistan and Baluchestan. Three other markedly poor cities were located in Kerman province.

Historical provinces
 Khorasan Province
 Bahrain Province

See also 

 List of current Iran governors-general
 List of Iranian provinces by Human Development Index
 Administrative divisions of Iran
 Regions of Iran
 Counties of Iran
 Geography of Iran
 ISO 3166-2:IR

References and notes

External links

 
 Statistical Centre, Government of Iran
 Iranian Provinces Investment – Trade Promotion Organization of Iran, affiliated to the Ministry of Commerce (Iran)
 

 Official provincial websites

 Ardabil
 East Azarbaijan
 West Azarbaijan
 Bushehr
 Chahar Mahaal and Bakhtiari
 Fars
 Gilan
 Golestan
 Hamadan
 Hormozgan
 Ilam
 Isfahan
 Kerman
 Kermanshah
 North Khorasan
 Razavi Khorasan
 South Khorasan
 Khuzestan
 Kohgiluyeh and Boyer Ahmad
 Kurdistan
 Lorestan
 Markazi
 Mazandaran
 Qazvin
 Qom
 Semnan
 Sistan and Baluchestan
 Tehran
 Yazd
 Zanjan

 
Iran 1
Provinces, Iran
Iran geography-related lists
Iran, Provinces
Subdivisions of Iran